The year 2011 is the 2nd year in the history of the Fight Nights Global, a mixed martial arts and kickboxing promotion based in Russia. It started broadcasting through a television agreement with  REN TV.

List of events

Fight Nights: Battle of Moscow 3

Fight Nights: Battle of Moscow 3 was a mixed martial arts and kickboxing event held by Fight Nights Global on March 12, 2011 at the Crocus City Hall in Moscow, Russia.

Background

Result

Fight Nights: Battle of Moscow 4

Fight Nights: Battle Of Moscow 4 was a mixed martial arts and kickboxing event held by Fight Nights Global on July 7, 2011 at the Crocus City Hall in Moscow, Russia.

Background

Result

Kickboxing 65 kg Tournament bracket

Fight Nights: The Fights With and Without Rules

Fight Nights: The Fights With and Without Rules was a mixed martial arts and kickboxing event held by Fight Nights Global on September 21, 2011 at the Korston Hotel in Moscow, Russia.

Background

Result

Fight Nights: Battle of Moscow 5

Fight Nights: Battle Of Moscow 5 was a mixed martial arts and kickboxing event held by Fight Nights Global on November 5, 2011 at the Dynamo Sports Palace in Moscow, Russia.

Background

Result

References

Fight Nights Global events
2011 in mixed martial arts
2011 in kickboxing
AMC Fight Nights